The 2006–07 Mississippi State basketball team represented Mississippi State University in the 2006–07 college basketball season. Under head coach Rick Stansbury, the team played their home games at Humphrey Coliseum in Starkville, Mississippi, and was a member of the Southeastern Conference.

Previous season 
The Bulldogs finished the season 15–15, 5–11 in SEC play. They did not play in a postseason tournament after having made the NCAA Tournament the previous four seasons.

Before the season

Departures

Recruits

Roster

References 

Mississippi State
Mississippi State Bulldogs men's basketball seasons
Mississippi State
Bull
Bull